The 1983 Maine Black Bears football team represented the University of Maine as a member of the Yankee Conference during the 1983 NCAA Division I-AA football season. Led by third-year head coach Ron Rogerson, the Black Bears compiled an overall record of 4–6 with a conference mark of 0–5, placing last out of six teams in the Yankee Conference.

Schedule

References

Maine
Maine Black Bears football seasons
Maine Black Bears football